Sasaki is a design firm specializing in Architecture, Interior Design, Urban Design, Space Planning, Landscape Architecture, Ecology, Civil Engineering, and Place Branding.  The firm is headquartered in Boston, Massachusetts, but practices on an international scale, with offices in Shanghai, and Denver, Colorado, and clients and projects globally.

History
Sasaki was founded in 1953 by landscape architect Hideo Sasaki while he served as a professor and landscape architecture chair at the Harvard Graduate School of Design. Sasaki was founded upon collaborative, interdisciplinary design, unprecedented in design practice at the time, and an emphasis on the integration of land, buildings, people, and their contexts.

Through the mid to late 1900s, Sasaki designed plazas (including Copley Square), corporate parks, college campuses, and master plans, among other projects.

The firm includes a team of in house designers, software developers, and data analysts who support the practice. Today, Sasaki has over 300 employees across its diverse practice areas and between its two offices. The firm engages in a wide variety of project types, across its many disciplines.

Milestones
In 2000, in honor of the passing of the firm's founder, the family of Hideo Sasaki together with Sasaki and other financial supporters, established the Sasaki Foundation. The foundation, which is a separate entity from Sasaki, gives yearly grants, supporting community-led research at Sasaki. 
In 2012, Sasaki opened an office in Shanghai to support the firm's work in China and the larger Asia Pacific region.

In 2018, Sasaki opened the Incubator, a coworking space designed by and located within the Sasaki campus, which houses the Sasaki Foundation as curator of programming. The 5,000 square-foot space is home to several like-minded non-profits, organizations, and individuals.

In 2020, Sasaki established a new office in Denver, Colorado, marking the firm's third physical studio location. Opening an office in Denver, a region where Sasaki has been working since the 1960s, positions Sasaki to deliver on projects across western North America.

Awards and recognition
In 2007, Sasaki was honored as the American Society of Landscape Architects firm of the year. In 2012, Sasaki won the American Planning Association firm of the year award.

Sasaki has earned numerous consecutive Pierre L'Enfant International Planning awards from the American Planning Association. In 2017, two of the five annual finalists for the Rudy Bruner Award for Urban Excellence were Sasaki projects: the Bruce C. Bolling Municipal Building (Boston, MA) and the Chicago Riverwalk both were recognized as silver medalists. Sasaki has been named a top 50 firm by Architect Magazine numerous times.

The firm has been recognized by the Boston Society of Landscape Architects (BSLA), Boston Society of Architects (BSA), American Planning Association (APA), American Institute of Architecture (AIA), Society for College and University Planning (SCUP), Urban Land Initiative (ULI), Dezeen, and Fast Company, among others.

Research
Notable Sasaki-sponsored research projects include Sea-Change Boston (2016 ASLA Honor Award), Shifting Gears: An Urbanist's take on autonomous vehicles (2019 Fast Company honorable mention), Understanding Homelessness, and Where Design Meets Play.

Select projects
Sasaki has a large portfolio of work, which includes:

 Charleston Waterfront Park; Charleston, SC
 2008 Beijing Olympic Green; Beijing, China
 Bruce C. Bolling Building (with Mecanoo Architecten); Boston, MA
 Chicago Riverwalk; Chicago, IL (Phases 2 and 3)
 Universidad de Lima Masterplan; Lima, Peru
 Nord Family Greenway; Cleveland, OH
 Zidell Yards Masterplan; Portland, OR
 Middlebury College Virtue Fieldhouse; Middlebury, VT
 Microsoft New England Research and Development Center (NERD); Cambridge, MA
 Chengdu Panda Reserve; Chengdu, China
 Bonnet Springs Park; Lakeland, FL
 Tecnologico de Monterrey new main library; Monterrey, Nuevo León, Mexico
 Wuhan Yangtze Riverfront Park; Wuhan, China
 Clemson University Core Campus Dining Facility; Clemson, SC
 Wolverine Worldwide; Waltham, MA
 Virginia Polytechnic Institute and State University Master Plan Update; Blacksburg, VA
 Sacred Heart University Martire Business and Communications Center; Fairfield, CT
 The Lawn on D; Boston, MA
 University of Washington Campus Master Plan and Innovation District Framework; Seattle, WA
 Smale Riverfront Park; Cincinnati, OH
 Salisbury University Patricia R Guerrieri Academic Commons; Salisbury, MD
 Dar Ul-aman and Massoud Corridor Districts; Kabul, Afghanistan
 The Incubator at Sasaki; Watertown, MA
 Georgetown University Pedro Arrupe, S.J. Hall; Washington D.C.
 Boston City Hall Plaza; Boston, MA
 Denver Airport Strategic Plan; Denver, CO
 Lincoln Memorial Landscape and Reflecting Pool; Washington D.C.
 Greenwich Academy Masterplan; Greenwhich, CT
 798 Arts District Plan; Beijing, China
 The Lawrenceville School Masterplan and Implementation; Lawrenceville NJ
 401 Congress Street; Boston, MA

Gallery

References

Landscape architecture
Planning
Urban design
Interior design
Ecology